Celerina heffernani, known commonly as Hefferman's starfish, is a species of marine echinoderms in the family Ophidiasteridae.

Celerina heffernani is widespread throughout the tropical waters of the Indo-Pacific area.

This starfish can be distinguished from Fromia monilis by a unique range of short spikes lying on both side of the arms groove.

References

External links
http://www.marinespecies.org/aphia.php?p=taxdetails&id=292787
http://eol.org/pages/4704774/details
 CELERINA HEFFERNANI - (LIVINGSTONE, 1931) New Caledonia

Ophidiasteridae
Animals described in 1931